Étienne Mattler (25 December 1905 – 23 March 1986) was a French international footballer, nicknamed Le Lion de Belfort.

Career
Mattler, born in Belfort, played for the clubs US Belfort (1921–1927), AS Troyes (1927–1929), and FC Sochaux (1929–1946) where he won two Ligue 1 titles in 1935 and 1938 and one Coupe de France in 1937.

For the national team, he won 46 caps and participated in the 1930, 1934 and 1938 World Cups, being one of five players to have appeared in all three of the pre-war World Cups. He died at 80 years old.

References and notes

External links
Player profile at the official web site of the French Football Federation
 
 

1905 births
1986 deaths
Sportspeople from Belfort
French people of German descent
French footballers
France international footballers
Association football defenders
ES Troyes AC players
FC Sochaux-Montbéliard players
Ligue 1 players
1930 FIFA World Cup players
1934 FIFA World Cup players
1938 FIFA World Cup players
French football managers
FC Sochaux-Montbéliard managers
Footballers from Bourgogne-Franche-Comté